The 2019 CONMEBOL Copa América Femenina de Futsal was the 7th edition of the Copa América Femenina de Futsal, the international futsal championship under FIFA rules organised by CONMEBOL for the women's national teams of South America. The tournament was held in Luque, Paraguay between 13 and 20 December 2019.

Teams
All ten CONMEBOL member national teams entered the tournament.

Venues
The matches were played at the Polideportivo del Comité Olímpico Paraguayo in Luque.

Draw
The draw of the tournament was held on 19 November 2019, 18:00 PYST (UTC−3), at the Paraguayan Olympic Committee headquarters at Luque, Paraguay. The ten teams were drawn into two groups of five. The hosts, Paraguay, and the title holders, Brazil, were seeded in Groups A and B respectively, while the other eight teams were divided into four pots based on their results in the 2017 Copa América Femenina de Futsal, and were drawn to the remaining group positions.

Squads

Each team has to submit a squad of 14 players, including a minimum of two goalkeepers.

Group stage
The top two teams of each group advance to the semi-finals.

Tiebreakers
The ranking of teams in the first stage is determined as follows (Regulations Article 8):
 Points obtained in all group matches (three points for a win, one for a draw, none for a defeat);
 Goal difference in all group matches;
 Number of goals scored in all group matches;
 Points obtained in the matches played between the teams in question;
 Goal difference in the matches played between the teams in question;
 Number of goals scored in the matches played between the teams in question;
 Fair play points in all group matches (only one deduction could be applied to a player in a single match): 
 Drawing of lots.

All times local, PYST (UTC−3).

Group A

Group B

Knockout stage
In the knockout stage, extra time and penalty shoot-out would be used to decide the winner if necessary (no extra time would be used in the play-offs for third to tenth place).

Bracket

Ninth place play-off

Semi-finals

Seventh place play-off

Fifth place play-off

Third place play-off

Final

Final ranking

References

External links
Copa América Femenina de Futsal Paraguay 2019, CONMEBOL.com

2019
2019 in South American futsal
2019 in Paraguayan football
December 2019 sports events in South America
2019 Copa America Femenina Futsal